The 1907–08 season was the fifteenth season in which Dundee competed at a Scottish national level, playing in Division One, where they would finish in 4th place. Dundee would also compete in the Scottish Cup, where they would lose to Aberdeen in the second round.

Scottish Division One 

Statistics provided by Dee Archive

League table

Scottish Cup 

Statistics provided by Dee Archive

Player Statistics 
Statistics provided by Dee Archive

|}

See also 

 List of Dundee F.C. seasons

References 

 

Dundee F.C. seasons
Dundee